Sigrid Norris is a New Zealand linguist and academic. She is currently a full professor at the Auckland University of Technology.

Academic career

After an undergraduate in Russian literature and a 2002 PhD titled  'A theoretical framework for multimodal discourse analysis presented via the analysis of identity construction of two women living in Germany'  both from the Georgetown University, she moved to the Auckland University of Technology, rising to full professor.

Selected works 
 Norris, Sigrid. Analyzing multimodal interaction: A methodological framework. Routledge, 2004.
 Jones, Rodney H., and Sigrid Norris. Discourse in action: Introducing mediated discourse analysis. Routledge, 2005.
 Norris, Sigrid. Identity in (inter) action: Introducing multimodal (inter) action analysis. Vol. 4. Walter de Gruyter, 2011.
 Norris, Sigrid. "Multimodal discourse analysis: A conceptual framework." Discourse and technology: Multimodal discourse analysis (2004): 101–115.
 Norris, Sigrid. "The implication of visual research for discourse analysis: transcription beyond language." Visual communication 1, no. 1 (2002): 97–121.
 Norris, Sigrid. "Modal density and modal configurations: Multimodal actions." 2009). The Routledge handbook of Multimodal Analysis. Oxon: Routledge (2009): 78–90.

References

External links
  
 
 

Living people
1961 births
New Zealand women academics
Georgetown University alumni
Academic staff of the Auckland University of Technology
Linguists from New Zealand
Women linguists